Miners' federation may refer to several former trade unions:

Miners' Federation (France)
Miners' Federation of Australia
Miners' Federation of Great Britain
Lancashire and Cheshire Miners' Federation
Midland Counties Miners' Federation
North Staffordshire Miners' Federation
Scottish Miners' Federation
South Wales Miners' Federation
Miners' International Federation
Western Federation of Miners, in the United States